Santo Christo Church is an historic church located at 240 Columbia Street in Fall River, Massachusetts, dedicated to the Lord Holy Christ of the Miracles. The parish was formally established in 1889 to serve in the local Portuguese community, after two decades of itinerant services by priests from New Bedford.

The Gothic Revival-style church building was built in 1924–27 to a design by the architectural firm of Murphy & Hindle.  It is stylistically subdued, but has fine stained glass windows, a tile roof with copper coping, and cast stone pinnacles.

The building was listed on the National Register of Historic Places in 1983. A building restoration project began in late 2013. As of June 2021 the pastor is the Very Rev. Jeffrey Cabral, who is also the Judicial Vicar for the Diocese of Fall River.

Masses are celebrated in English Sunday's at 10:00am and Portuguese Saturday at 4pm and Sunday 8am and 12pm (Summer hours: 8am and 11am).

See also
 National Register of Historic Places listings in Fall River, Massachusetts

References

Churches on the National Register of Historic Places in Massachusetts
Roman Catholic churches in Fall River, Massachusetts
Portuguese-American culture in Massachusetts
National Register of Historic Places in Fall River, Massachusetts